Czech Post (Czech: Česká pošta) is the state-owned postal company of the Czech Republic. With its headquarters in Prague, the corporation has around 31,000 employees. Czech Post primarily serves the Czech Republic but also delivers to other countries.

History 

Česká pošta was established on 1 January 1993, on the Dissolution of Czechoslovakia, separated from the Slovak postal service, as well as from Cesky Telecom. All these organisations had previously been united under the Administration of Posts and Telecommunications, but were split following a decision from the Minister of Economy on 16 December.

In 1993 implementation of the APOST automatic postal system began.

On 29 May 1999 the postal service moved from the "outpatient method" of sorting items, whereby they were processed during the trip, to a system in which all mail was sorted in the collection transport hubs (SPUs) or at post offices. On 1 April 2005 Česká pošta became the responsibility of the Czech Telecommunication Office. On 1 September that year the service received a certificate of accreditation for the provision of digital signatures.
 
On 1 September 2006, at the request of the Czech Telecommunications Office, 593 Post was renamed so that mail contains the name consistently modified the name of municipality (without specifying the attributes), except in the villages with the name composed of names of the two villages where the name of the mail, include only the name of one of the parts. On 1 October 2006, a decision of the Director General of Česká pošta canceled the operation of the branch plant, OZ shipping and commercial services and OZ VAKUS (acronym from the original name of Computer and control switchboard connections).

On 22 November 2006 the Supervisory Board discussed a proposal to convert Česká pošta into a limited company, and instructed the Director-General Karl Kratina to develop the proposal further.

A new SPU was opened in Brno in May 2007, replacing three former centres in Brno, Břeclav and Jihlava. Later in 2007 the government approved a plan to transform Česká pošta into a joint stock company, effective mid-2009. In March 2012, legislation was passed to remove the last monopoly from the service, exclusive delivery of items under 50 grams. This legislation came into effect in January 2013. Martin Elkán became the new CEO of Česká pošta in June 2014. In July 2014, Elkán announced a plan to franchise approximately 200 smaller post offices within the Czech Republic, with 49 franchises already in operation.

On 18 June 2018 Roman Knapp became CEO of Česká pošta.

Structure 
Under the scope of the Directorate-General there are currently seven branches and 11 SPUs:

 Central Bohemia (01)
 South Bohemia (02)
 West Bohemia (03)
 Northern Bohemia (04)
 East Bohemia (05)
 South Moravia (06)
 Northern Moravia (07)

References

External links
www.cpost.cz

Companies of the Czech Republic
Companies based in Prague
Transport companies established in 1993
Postal organizations
Postal system of the Czech Republic
Czech brands
Czech companies established in 1993